Nová Role is a town in Karlovy Vary District in the Karlovy Vary Region of the Czech Republic. It has about 4,100 inhabitants.

Administrative parts
Villages of Jimlíkov and Mezirolí are administrative parts of Nová Role.

Geography
It lies on the Rotava river. The town proper lies in the Sokolov Basin, but the municipal territory also extends to the north into the Ore Mountains.

History
The first written mention of Nová Role is from 1293.

During World War II, Nazi German Neurohlau concentration camp was located here.

Twin towns – sister cities

Nová Role is twinned with:
 Breitenbrunn, Germany

References

External links

Cities and towns in the Czech Republic
Populated places in Karlovy Vary District